Matawalu was a Fijian chief. He was the son of Niumataiwalu—first Roko Sau of Lau Islands—and Uma of Nukunuku. 

Matawalu became the fourth Roko Sau, ruler of the Lau Islands, after the death of his half-brother Rasolo, but never succeeded to the title of Tu'i Nayau. Matawalu had been exiled to Nayau by his elder half-brother Uluilakeba I. When Uluilakeba was killed by Bauan forces, Matawalu led the counter invading force for Rasolo at the request of Lakeba‘s people. It is said that Matawalu despised the Tongans, his sister-in-law Laufitu's people and their growing influence in Lakeba. On succeeding Rasolo, Matawalu removed himself to self-exile on Bau Island.

Matawalu’s half-nephew Nayacatabu, son of Uluilakeba, was left as regent in Matawalu’s absence, but was killed in a foray against the neighbouring island of Cicia. It was during this period that Dranivia seized power and declared himself Roko Sau. His claim to power was short lived. While on a tour of Southern Lau, Matawalu returned to Lakeba, retook overlordship and gave orders to prevent Dranivia's return. Dranivia attempted to seize Lakeba again by force, but failed.

Matawalu's dislike for Tongans resulted in direct conflict with his other nephew Malani, who was half-Tongan through his mother, Laufitu. A battle ensued between the two opposing factions and Matawalu was killed.

Matawalu married Siri of Waitabu and from him is descended the majority of the Koroicumu household of the Vuanirewa clan.

Fijian chiefs
People from Lakeba
Vuanirewa